In Greek mythology, Rhoeo (Rhoiṓ) was the daughter of Staphylus and Chrysothemis, sister to Parthenos and Molpadia or Hemithea.

Mythology 
Parthenius relates that she once experienced a great jealousy of her sister Hemithea when Staphylus arranged for the latter to spend a night with Lyrcus, his guest, whom both Hemithea and Rhoeo fell in love with.

She became the lover of Apollo and by him the mother of Anius. When her father discovered her pregnancy, he believed she was impregnated by a man rather than a god. He placed her in a chest and cast her out to sea (parallel to Danae and Perseus).  She landed on the island of Delos, which was sacred to Apollo. She gave birth to a son on the island and named him Anius (as if from  "to suffer"); she then put him on the altar of Apollo and prayed to the god that the baby be saved if it was his. Apollo concealed the child for a while, then raised him and taught him the art of divination and granted him certain honors.

Rhoeo eventually married Zarex, son of Carystus or Carycus, who accepted Anius as his son. She had two more children with him. Later, becoming a priest of Apollo and the king of Delos, Anius gave aid to Aeneas and his retinue when they were travelling from Troy to the future site of Rome.

See also 
  for Jovian asteroid 5258 Rhoeo

Notes

References

 Diodorus Siculus, The Library of History translated by Charles Henry Oldfather. Twelve volumes. Loeb Classical Library. Cambridge, Massachusetts: Harvard University Press; London: William Heinemann, Ltd. 1989. Vol. 3. Books 4.59–8. Online version at Bill Thayer's Web Site
 Diodorus Siculus, Bibliotheca Historica. Vol 1-2. Immanel Bekker. Ludwig Dindorf. Friedrich Vogel. in aedibus B. G. Teubneri. Leipzig. 1888–1890. Greek text available at the Perseus Digital Library.
 Parthenius, Love Romances translated by Sir Stephen Gaselee (1882-1943), S. Loeb Classical Library Volume 69. Cambridge, MA. Harvard University Press. 1916.  Online version at the Topos Text Project.
Parthenius, Erotici Scriptores Graeci, Vol. 1. Rudolf Hercher. in aedibus B. G. Teubneri. Leipzig. 1858. Greek text available at the Perseus Digital Library.
Tzetzes, John, Book of Histories, Book V-VI translated by Konstantinos Ramiotis from the original Greek of T. Kiessling's edition of 1826. Online version at theio.com.

Further reading 

Smith, William; Dictionary of Greek and Roman Biography and Mythology, London (1873). "Rhoeo"

Women of Apollo
Women in Greek mythology
Characters in Greek mythology